Belleville Cop is a French police comedy film directed by Rachid Bouchareb and premiere-released in 2018. Leading actors are Omar Sy, Luis Guzmán and Franck Gastambide.

Film was presented at French Cinepanorama (Hong Kong French Film Festival) 2018, on three screens.

Plot
Born in Belleville (Paris neighbourhood), Sebastian Bouchard, known as "Baaba", became a police officer. He is determined to stay in Belleville, to the despair of his girlfriend wishing to live elsewhere. Baaba is struggling to get away from his slightly invasive mother.

One night in a restaurant, Roland, his childhood friend, is murdered before his eyes. Roland was a liaison officer at the Consulate General of France in Miami and was visiting Paris for an investigation into drug trafficking. Baaba then decides to go to Florida, taking with him his mother. In Miami, he is flanked by a jaded and irascible local cop, Ricardo Garcia. The two men will then be forced to work together despite everything that separates them.

Cast

Production
In 2011, Rachid Bouchareb announced his desire to make an "American trilogy" on relations between the United States and the "Arab world". The first of the three films should have been the buddy movie Belleville Cop, with Jamel Debbouze and Queen Latifah. The first finally became the TV movie Just like a Woman, road movie with Sienna Miller and Golshifteh Farahani, broadcast in 2012. It was followed by Two Men in Town, with Forest Whitaker, Harvey Keitel and Luis Guzmán.

Now third project was then renamed  for France. The main roles are then taken over in 2017 by Omar Sy and Luis Guzmán.

For the writing of the screenplay, Bouchareb cites the Beverly Hills Cop but also buddy movies like 48 Hrs., Lethal Weapon and L'emmerdeur. He collaborated with one of the 48 Hrs. writers, Larry Gross.

Shooting

The filming began in March 2017 in Paris, in the 20th arrondissement. It later continued in Miami and Los Angeles, as well as Riohacha, La Guajira in Colombia.

Exhibition and box office
The film was released on 17 October 2018 on 550 screens. It only made 30,220 entries for its debut day despite a big promotion and the fact that Omar Sy is a leading actor. For the first week, it had only 248,868 entries. It finished theaters exhibition with 630,283 entries. It brought only $7M for a budget of $17M. After Knock, it's another commercial failure for Omar Sy.

Reception
On the French site Allociné, which lists 7 titles of press, the film obtained the average score of 2.0/5.

In Current Woman, Amélie Cordonnier describes the film "a nice detective comedy". In Le Parisien, Catherine Balle writes "the new feature film by Rachid Bouchareb, a comedy, is hard not to smile to and one gets lost in a fantastic scenario". For First, Pierre Lunn writes: "The new film by Rachid Bouchareb with Omar Sy is struggling to bring into existence the idea of a buddy cop movie in the French." Hélène Marzolf of Télérama wonders "what has happened to Rachid Bouchareb to make a film that" Americans would experience as "outrageous and not funny".

Soundtrack
Movie has 30 songs in its soundtrack album, some of which with folk note.

References

External links
 
 
 

2018 films
English-language French films
2010s French-language films
2010s crime comedy films
French action comedy films
French crime action films
French crime comedy films
Buddy comedy films
2010s buddy cop films
French detective films
2010s comedy mystery films
French comedy mystery films
2010s mystery thriller films
Films set in Paris
Films shot in Paris
Films shot in Miami
Films shot in Los Angeles
Films directed by Rachid Bouchareb
French multilingual films
2018 crime films
2018 comedy films
2010s English-language films
2018 multilingual films
2010s French films
Foreign films set in the United States